The 2021 Mosconi Cup (officially the 2021 Cazoo Mosconi Cup) was the 28th edition of an annual nine-ball pool tournament between teams representing Europe and the United States. It took place between 7 and 10 December 2021 at the Alexandra Palace in London, marking the second consecutive year that the tournament had been staged in England, and the first time since 2002 that the event did not alternate annually between the US and Europe. Sponsored by British online car retailer Cazoo, it was broadcast live on Sky Sports in the UK and on networks worldwide.

Team Europe were the defending champions, having won the previous year's tournament by a scoreline of 11–3. Alex Lely and Karl Boyes again served as Team Europe's non-playing captain and vice-captain, while Jeremy Jones again captained Team USA, with Shane Van Boening promoted to playing vice-captain. Earl Strickland, selected to play on Team USA for the first time since 2013, was forced to withdraw after he came into close contact with a case of COVID-19 on his flight to the UK. Jones, who had intended to act as non-playing captain, came out of retirement to take Strickland's place on the players' roster.

The teams were level at 2–2 after the first session. Team USA won three of the first four matches in the second session to lead 5–3, and looked likely to extend their lead when Jones and Chris Reinhold won four of the first five racks against Europe's Eklent Kaçi and David Alcaide. However, the Europeans fought back to win the match with four consecutive racks, leaving Team USA with a 5–4 overnight lead. Team Europe surged ahead in the third session, winning all five matches. In the final match of the session, with Jones and Alcaide locked in an intense safety battle in the deciding rack, Jones asked referee Marcel Eckardt to clean the cue ball with 12 seconds remaining on his shot clock, mistakenly believing that the clock would be stopped while the ball was cleaned. With no extensions remaining, Jones incurred a time foul, giving Alcaide ball in hand to run out the rack for a session whitewash.  Leading 9–5 going into the final day, Team Europe won two of the last three matches to retain the Mosconi Cup by a scoreline of 11–6, giving Europe the overall series lead at 14–13, with one tie. Jayson Shaw was Most Valuable Player, making him only the third player in Mosconi Cup history to be MVP for two consecutive years.

Teams

Results

Tuesday, 7 December

Wednesday, 8 December

Thursday, 9 December

Friday, 10 December

Notes

References

External links
 Official homepage

2021
2021 in cue sports
2021 in English sport
International sports competitions hosted by England
December 2021 sports events in the United Kingdom
2021 sports events in London